Christian Guiberteau (born 6 January 1968) is a directeur sportif with the  cycling team.

Notes

External links
 

Directeur sportifs
1968 births
Living people
People from Cholet
Sportspeople from Maine-et-Loire